Renalto Alves is a Brazilian actor, cinematographer and director. He was born in 1950 in Paranavaí in Paraná, Brazil.

External links

Brazilian male actors
Brazilian cinematographers
Brazilian film directors
1950 births
Living people
People from Paranavaí